Parkungi located at  in Central Darling Shire, New South Wales is a remote rural locality and civil parish of Yungnulgra County in far North West New South Wales.

Geography
The Parish has an arid landscape. The nearest town is Whitecliffs nearby to the west.

Climate
The parish has extremely hot summers and mild winters. The parish has a Köppen climate classification of BWh (Hot desert), and is almost unpopulated, with fewer than two inhabitants per square kilometer.

History
The Parish is on the traditional lands of the Wandjiwalgu Aboriginal peoples.

In 1838 Thomas Mitchell travelled down the nearby Darling River. Charles Sturt passed through the Wandjiwalgu lands during 1845. In 1861 the Burke and Wills expedition passed nearby. Opal was discovered in the area in the late 19th century.

References

Towns in New South Wales
Parishes of New South Wales